Scott Meyer may refer to:
Scott Meyer (baseball) (born 1957), catcher in Major League Baseball
Scott Meyer (author), author of the webcomic Basic Instructions and the comic fantasy series Magic 2.0
Scott James Meyer (born 1981), attorney, comedian and writer
Scott Meyer (ice hockey), American ice hockey player and coach
Scott Meyer (politician), member of the North Dakota Senate
Scott Meyer (skier), represented United States at the 2014 Winter Paralympics
Scott Meyer (soccer), played for Indiana Invaders

See also
Scott Mayer (disambiguation)
Scott Meyers (born 1959), American author and software consultant
Scott Myers (disambiguation)